Cinder Cliff is a cinder cone in northern British Columbia, Canada. It is thought to have last erupted during the Holocene period and is part of the Mount Edziza volcanic complex.

See also
List of volcanoes in Canada
List of Northern Cordilleran volcanoes
Volcanism of Canada
Volcanism of Western Canada

References

Cinder cones of British Columbia
Holocene volcanoes
Monogenetic cinder cones
Mount Edziza volcanic complex
One-thousanders of British Columbia